The Western Zhou (c. 1045 BC – 771 BC) was a royal dynasty of China and the first half of the Zhou dynasty. It began when King Wu of Zhou overthrew the Shang dynasty at the Battle of Muye and ended when the Quanrong nomads sacked its capital Haojing and killed King You of Zhou in 771 BC.

The Western Zhou early state was successful for about seventy-five years and then slowly lost power. The former Shang lands were divided into hereditary fiefs which became increasingly independent of the king. In 771 BC, the Zhou were driven out of the Wei River valley; afterwards real power was in the hands of the king's nominal vassals.

Civil war

Few records survive from this early period and accounts from the Western Zhou period cover little beyond a list of kings with uncertain dates. King Wu died two or three years after the conquest. Because his son, King Cheng of Zhou was young, his brother, the Duke of Zhou Ji Dan assisted the young and inexperienced king as regent. Wu's other brothers (Shu Du of Cai, Guan Shu, and Huo Shu), concerned about the Duke of Zhou's growing power, formed an alliance with Wu Geng and other regional rulers and Shang remnants in the rebellion of the Three Guards. The Duke of Zhou stamped out this rebellion and conquered more territory to bring other people under Zhou rule. 

The Duke formulated the Mandate of Heaven doctrine to counter Shang claims to a divine right of rule and founded Luoyang as an eastern capital.  With a feudal fengjian system, royal relatives and generals were given fiefs in the east, including Luoyang, Jin, Ying, Lu, Qi and Yan. While this was designed to maintain Zhou authority as it expanded its rule over a larger amount of territory, many of these became major states when the dynasty weakened. When the Duke of Zhou stepped down as regent, the remainder of Cheng's reign and that of his son King Kang of Zhou seem to have been peaceful and prosperous.

Further kings

The fourth king, King Zhao of Zhou led an army south against Chu and was killed along with a large part of the Zhou army. The fifth king, King Mu of Zhou is remembered for his legendary visit to the Queen Mother of the West. Territory was lost to the Xu Rong in the southeast. The kingdom seems to have weakened during Mu's long reign, possibly because the familial relationship between Zhou Kings and regional rulers thinned over generations so that fiefs that were originally held by royal brothers were now held by third and fourth cousins; peripheral territories also developed local power and prestige on par with that of the Zhou royal family. 

The reigns of the next four kings (King Gong of Zhou, King Yi of Zhou (Ji Jian), King Xiao of Zhou, and King Yi of Zhou (Ji Xie)) are poorly documented. The ninth king is said to have boiled the Duke of Qi in a cauldron, implying that the vassals were no longer obedient. The tenth king, King Li of Zhou (877–841 BC) was forced into exile and power was held for fourteen years by the Gonghe Regency. Li's overthrow may have been accompanied by China's first recorded peasant rebellion. When Li died in exile, Gonghe retired and power passed to Li's son King Xuan of Zhou (827–782 BC). King Xuan worked to restore royal authority, though regional lords became less obedient later in his reign. The twelfth and last king of the Western Zhou period was King You of Zhou (781–771 BC). When You replaced his wife with a concubine, the former queen's powerful father, the Marquess of Shen, joined forces with Quanrong barbarians to sack the western capital of Haojing and kill King You in 771 BC. His killing resulted to beginning wars between local states which continued until Qin unification of China. Some scholars have surmised that the sack of Haojing might have been connected to a Scythian raid from the Altai before their westward expansion. Most of the Zhou nobles withdrew from the Wei River valley and the capital was reestablished downriver at the old eastern capital of Chengzhou near modern-day Luoyang. This was the start of the Eastern Zhou period, which is customarily divided into the Spring and Autumn period and the Warring States period.

It is possible that the Zhou kings derived most of their income from royal lands in the Wei valley.  This would explain the sudden loss of royal power when the Zhou were driven east, but the matter is hard to prove. In recent decades, archaeologists have found a significant number of treasure hoards that were buried in the Wei valley about the time the Zhou were expelled. This implies that the Zhou nobles were suddenly driven from their homes and hoped to return, but never did.

Kings

Notes

References

Citations

Works cited

Further reading

Zhou dynasty
8th-century BC disestablishments
Dynasties in Chinese history